Sir Tasker Watkins  (18 November 1918 – 9 September 2007) was a Welsh Lord Justice of Appeal and deputy Lord Chief Justice. He was President of the Welsh Rugby Union from 1993 to 2004. During the Second World War, he served in the British Army and was awarded the Victoria Cross, the highest British award for valour in the face of the enemy. A war hero who was prominent in the law and in Rugby Union, Watkins was described as The Greatest Living Welshman.

Early life
Watkins was born in the small town of Nelson, Glamorgan, the son of Bertram Watkins, an engine fitter, and his wife Jane Watkins, née Phillips. He won a scholarship to Pontypridd Boys' Grammar School. In 1931 he moved with his parents to Dagenham in east London. He attended school in Romford where he captained the cricket and football teams and played rugby. After leaving school he worked for export agents and a halibut oil company and became a teacher in London.

Second World War
Following the outbreak of the Second World War in September 1939, Watkins joined the British Army, initially as a private in the Duke of Cornwall's Light Infantry, in October. After serving for over a year as a private he was sent for officer training and was commissioned, with the rank of second lieutenant, into the Welch Regiment on 17 May 1941. He was given the service number 187088. He was posted to the regiment's 1/5th Battalion, a Territorial Army (TA) unit. The battalion was one of three (the others being the 4th Welch Regiment and the 2nd Monmouthshire Regiment) which formed part of the 160th Infantry Brigade, itself being one of three brigades (the others being the 158th and 159th) forming the 53rd (Welsh) Infantry Division. The division, then commanded by Major General Gerard Bucknall, was serving in Northern Ireland until moving to Wales late in 1941, and then to Kent in April 1942, where it remained for over two years before it saw action, until then being engaged in training and military exercises.

As a lieutenant, Watkins departed for France with the rest of the 53rd Division, commanded by Major General Robert Knox Ross, arriving in late June 1944, just weeks after the D-Day landings. The division participated in a number of engagements, such as the Second Battle of the Odon, and, in August, the battle of the Falaise Pocket. By mid-August Watkins, commanding "B" Company in his battalion, which had by now been transferred from the 160th Brigade to the 158th Brigade, was one officer in a group leading an assault on a German machine gun post. After the other officers were killed in the approach, Watkins continued to lead the group, leading a bayonet charge against 50 armed enemy infantry and then single-handedly taking out a machine-gun post to ensure the safety of his unit.

He was the first Welsh member of the British Army to be awarded a VC during the Second World War. His citation read:

Watkins' active service ended in October 1944 when he was badly wounded in the battle to liberate the Dutch city of 'sHertogenbosch, where a memorial service was held for him in St. John's Cathedral in 2007. He rarely spoke about the war. Of the event which led to him being awarded the VC he simply stated, in a 1955 radio interview:

He stated in another interview with The Daily Telegraph in 2001:

Wales rugby coach Graham Henry had Watkins' citation pinned up on the wall of the Welsh changing room before Six Nations encounters.

Watkins' VC is on display in the Lord Ashcroft Gallery in the Imperial War Museum.

Career
Watkins later achieved the rank of major, and on leaving the Army, studied law. He was called to the bar (became a barrister) at the Middle Temple in 1948. He became a Queen's Counsel in 1965, and in 1966-67 was Counsel to the Tribunal on the inquiry into the Aberfan disaster, which happened a few miles from his birthplace.

Watkins was deputy chairman of Radnorshire Quarter Sessions between 1962 and 1971, and of Carmarthenshire Quarter Sessions from 1966 until 1971. He was Recorder of Merthyr Tydfil between 1968 and 1970 and of Swansea during 1970 and 1971. He was Leader of the Wales and Chester Circuit from 1970–71.

In 1971, he was appointed to the High Court bench, where he sat in the Family Division between 1971 and 1974, and thereafter, until 1980, in the Queen's Bench Division. He was a Presiding Judge of the Wales and Chester Circuit from 1975 until he was promoted to the Court of Appeal (receiving the customary appointment to the Privy Council) in 1980. He became the first Senior Presiding Judge in 1983. Lord Lane appointed him Deputy Chief Justice in 1988, a post which he continued to hold under Lane's successor as Lord Chief Justice, Lord Taylor of Gosforth, until retiring from the bench in 1993.

Watkins was a chairman of the Mental Health Review Tribunal, Wales Region, between 1960 and 1971 and was also chairman of the Judicial Studies Board during 1979 and 1980.

Welsh Rugby Union
Watkins played Rugby Union football as an outside-half for the Army, Cardiff RFC and Glamorgan Wanderers. He became president of the Welsh Rugby Union in 1993, overseeing the switch from the amateur era to professionalism and the move from club to regional rugby in Wales. He stepped down on 26 September 2004 as the first man since Sir David Rocyn Jones in 1953 to hold office for more than one season.   His 11 years of service made him the second longest serving president in the WRU's 123-year history.

Watkins was also chairman, President of Glamorgan Wanderers, and patron until his death. Watkins is now honoured by Glamorgan Wanderers as their First XV team shirt has the letters STW-VC (Sir Tasker Watkins VC) in a green box on the right shoulder. The Wanderers also have a working model statue of Watkins in their club house donated by Llantwit Major based sculptor Roger Andrews. It stands in a corner that has been called 'Tasker's Corner' by members of the club.  Watkins has been called "The most influential Welshman of the late 20th century."

Watkins was appointed an honorary life vice-patron of the WRU. On announcement of his death, the Welsh team wore black armbands for their 2007 Rugby World Cup game against Canada in Nantes, France, as a tribute to the former WRU president.

Other interests
Watkins was president of the University of Wales College of Medicine for 11 years from 1987, and was president of the British Legion in Wales from 1947 to 1968.

Watkins was once asked if he would like to become a Member of Parliament and was told he could make it to be Prime Minister. Upon his acceptance a safe seat would be found for him. Watkins turned this offer down.

Later life
After falling at his home in Llandaff in August 2007, Watkins was hospitalised at the University Hospital of Wales, Cardiff. Watkins died at the hospital on 9 September 2007. His funeral was held at Llandaff Cathedral on 15 September, and he was later cremated at Thornhill Crematorium.

Personal life
Watkins married Eirwen Evans in 1941. They had a son and a daughter.

Honours and decorations

Watkins was knighted in 1971. He was made a member of the Privy Council in 1980. Appointed Knight Grand Cross of the Order of the British Empire (GBE) in 1990 and Knight of Justice of the Order of St John (K.StJ) in 1998, on 12 April 2006 he was made a Freeman of the City of Cardiff, with Lord Mayor Freda Salway describing Watkins as "one of Wales' most notable citizens."

His VC and other honours are on display in the Lord Ashcroft Gallery at the Imperial War Museum, London.

Appointments
 Deputy lieutenant of Glamorgan (1956)
 Honorary Fellow of the Royal College of Surgeons of England (1992)
 President of the University of Wales College of Medicine (1987–1998)
 President of the Royal British Legion in Wales (1947–1968)
 President of the Welsh Rugby Union (1993–2004)
 Vice President of the Victoria Cross and George Cross Association (2002–2007)

Honorary degrees
Watkins was awarded several honorary degrees, including
University of Wales, LL. D. (1976)
University of Glamorgan, LL. D. (1996)

Statue
A statue of Watkins was commissioned to stand outside Gate C of the Millennium Stadium. The statue, nine feet tall, was sculpted by Llantwit Major based sculptor Roger Andrews.  The Assembly Government contributed £25,000, among other contributions.

See also
British VCs of World War 2 (John Laffin, 1997)
Monuments to Courage (David Harvey, 1999)
The Register of the Victoria Cross (This England, 1997)

References

External links
Obituary, The Guardian, 9 September 2007
Obituary, The Times, 10 September 2007
Official portrait of Tasker Watkins by David Griffiths

1918 births
2007 deaths
British Army personnel of World War II
British Army recipients of the Victoria Cross
British World War II recipients of the Victoria Cross
Duke of Cornwall's Light Infantry officers
Family Division judges
Knights Bachelor
Knights Grand Cross of the Order of the British Empire
Knights of Justice of the Order of St John
Lords Justices of Appeal
Members of the Privy Council of the United Kingdom
People educated at Pontypridd High School
People from Caerphilly
20th-century King's Counsel
Wales Rugby Union officials
Welch Regiment officers
20th-century Welsh judges
Welsh recipients of the Victoria Cross
Welsh schoolteachers
Welsh King's Counsel
20th-century Welsh educators
Deputy Lieutenants of Glamorgan
British Battle of Normandy recipients of the Victoria Cross